The 2023 NCAA Division I Women's Basketball Championship Game is the upcoming final game of the 2023 NCAA Division I women's basketball tournament. It will determine the national champion for the 2022–23 NCAA Division I women's basketball season. The game will be played on April 2, 2023, at the American Airlines Center in Dallas, Texas.

Media coverage
The championship game will be televised in the United States by ABC.

See also
 2023 NCAA Division I Men's Basketball Championship Game
 2023 NCAA Division I Women's Basketball Tournament

References

External links
 2023 NCAA Division I Women's Final Four

Championship
NCAA Division I Women's Basketball Championship Games
NCAA Division I Women
April 2023 sports events in the United States
Basketball in Texas
College sports in Texas
Sports competitions in Dallas